Wang Can (177 – 17 February 217), courtesy name Zhongxuan, was a Chinese politician and poet who lived during the late Eastern Han dynasty of China. He contributed greatly to the establishment of laws and standards during the founding days of the vassal kingdom of Wei – the forerunner of the state of Cao Wei in the Three Kingdoms period – under the warlord Cao Cao, who was the de facto head of the Han central government in the final years of the Eastern Han dynasty. For his literary achievements, Wang Can was ranked among the Seven Scholars of Jian'an.

Wang Can was also renowned for his eidetic memory. The historical text Records of the Three Kingdoms described an incident where Wang Can was watching a game of weiqi. Someone accidentally knocked into the board and scattered the pieces. Wang Can then placed the pieces back to their original positions based on memory.

Life
Wang Can was from Gaoping County, Shanyang Commandery, which is around present-day Weishan County, Shandong. He was born in a family of high-ranking officials as a son of Wang Qian, a Chief Clerk to the general He Jin, who was briefly a regent for Emperor Shao in 189. Wang Can's great-grandfather, Wang Gong, and grandfather, Wang Chang, held offices among the Three Ducal Ministers during the reigns of Emperor Shun and Emperor Ling respectively.

When the warlord Dong Zhuo usurped power in 189, placing on the throne the puppet ruler Emperor Xian, Wang Can was merely 13 years old (by East Asian reckoning). A year later, Dong Zhuo moved the imperial capital from Luoyang to the more strategically secure Chang'an. Wang Can then headed to Chang'an, where he settled down for the next three years. In Chang'an, the prominent scholar and calligrapher Cai Yong recognised Wang Can's talent and recommended him to the civil service. Wang Can received several offers to serve in the government but he turned down all of them.

In 194, Wang Can went to Jing Province (covering present-day Hubei and Hunan) to seek a position under the provincial governor, Liu Biao. However, Liu Biao did not favour Wang Can as the latter looked pallid and sickly. After Liu Biao died in 208, Wang Can persuaded his son and successor, Liu Cong, to surrender to Cao Cao, the warlord who controlled the Han central government at the time.

Wang Can's talents came to fruition during his service in Cao Cao's administration. In 213, after Emperor Xian enfeoffed Cao Cao as the Duke of Wei and granted him ten cities to form his dukedom, Cao Cao tasked Wang Can with establishing a new system of laws and standards to replace the old one, which had largely fallen into disuse. In late 216, Wang Can accompanied Cao Cao on his fourth campaign against a rival warlord, Sun Quan.

Wang Can died of illness on the way back to Ye city (in present-day Handan, Hebei) in the spring of 217 at the age of 41 (by East Asian age reckoning). Cao Cao's heir apparent, Cao Pi, attended Wang Can's funeral and told the guests, "When he was still living, Wang Can loved the sounds of a donkey braying, so let's each make a braying sound as a farewell to him". Every guest did that.

Wang Can had two sons, who were executed in 219 for participating in a rebellion led by Wei Feng against Cao Cao's government. Their deaths resulted in the termination of Wang Can's family line. However, Wang Ye, a younger relative of Wang Can, was eventually designated as Wang Can's adopted son to continue his family line. Wang Ye inherited 10,000 of Wang Can's books and passed them on to his own sons, Wang Bi and Wang Hong.

Literary achievements
Wang Can was an established poet. Along with six other poets of his time, their poems formed the backbone of what was to be known as the Jian'an style. They were collectively called the "Seven Scholars of Jian'an". "Jian'an" was the era name of Emperor Xian's reign from 196 to 220.

The civil strife towards the end of the Eastern Han dynasty gave the Jian'an poems their characteristic solemn yet heart-stirring tone, while lament over the ephemerality of life was also a central theme of works from this period. In the history of Chinese literature, the Jian'an poems were a transition from the early folk songs into scholarly poetry. One of the representative works by Wang Can is the Poem of Seven Sorrows, a five-character poem lamenting the suffering of the people during the years of war. Wang Can also wrote a history book called Records of Heroes.

Anecdotes
Many anecdotes and stories related to Wang Can exist. It is recounted that when he was yet a youth, Cai Yong, then a high-ranking official, once saw him and was in awe. Later, Wang Can went to visit Cai Yong; although many guests of exalted rank were present, the host hastened to welcome the newcomer with the greatest deference, even wearing his shoes the wrong way in his haste. The others were astonished and asked why he was so respectful to a mere youth. "He is a young man with the highest gifts, which I cannot match. I shall grant him all the books and essays in my home," said Cai Yong. The Records of the Three Kingdoms stated that Wang Can was widely read and had a most retentive memory, better than any of his contemporaries. If he glanced at a roadside monument as he passed, he remembered every word of the inscription. If he saw people playing weiqi and the board was suddenly disturbed, he could replace every piece in its correct place.

See also

 Lists of people of the Three Kingdoms
 List of Chinese language poets

Notes

References

Citations

Bibliography
 Chen, Shou (3rd century). Records of the Three Kingdoms (Sanguozhi).
 
 Fan, Ye (5th century). Book of the Later Han (Houhanshu).
 Pei, Songzhi (5th century). Annotations to Records of the Three Kingdoms (Sanguozhi zhu).

177 births
217 deaths
3rd-century Chinese poets
Dong Zhuo and associates
Han dynasty poets
Han dynasty politicians from Shandong
Liu Biao and associates
Officials under Cao Cao
Poets from Shandong
Politicians from Jining
Seven scholars of Jian'an
Writers from Jining